Ousama Siddiki El Horfi (born 13 April 1998) is a Spanish professional footballer who plays as a right winger for Spanish club UD Logroñés.

Club career
Born in Tétouan, Siddiki moved to Spain at early age and joined Real Madrid's La Fábrica in January 2015, from AD Colmenar Viejo. In July 2017, he signed for EFL Championship side Leeds United, being initially assigned to the under-18 squad.

On 5 August 2018, Siddiki agreed to a contract with UD Logroñés, being initially assigned to the reserves in Tercera División. He made his senior debut on 26 August, starting and scoring the opener in a 2–0 away win against CD Agoncillo.

Siddiki made his first team debut on 20 January 2019, coming on as a late substitute for Víctor López in a 1–0 Segunda División B away win against Barakaldo CF. On 29 June, he renewed his contract until 2021, being definitely promoted to the main squad.

Siddiki featured sparingly for UDL during the 2019–20 campaign, contributing with 18 appearances overall as his side achieved a first-ever promotion to Segunda División. On 21 August 2020, he further extended his contract until 2022.

Siddiki made his professional debut on 26 September 2020, starting in a 1–1 home draw against CD Castellón.

References

External links
Real Madrid profile

1998 births
Living people
People from Tétouan
Moroccan footballers
Spanish footballers
Association football wingers
Segunda División players
Segunda División B players
Tercera División players
UD Logroñés B players
UD Logroñés players
Moroccan expatriate footballers
Moroccan expatriate sportspeople in England
Expatriate footballers in England
Moroccan expatriate sportspeople in Spain
Expatriate footballers in Spain